is a train station located in Yanagawa, Fukuoka.

Lines 
Nishi-Nippon Railroad
Tenjin Ōmuta Line

Platforms

Adjacent stations

Surrounding area
 Mammy's Shopping Center Nakashima store
 Nakashima Elementary School
 Fukuoka Bank Nakashima Branch
 Nakashima Shopping District
 7-Eleven Nakashima store
 Nakashima Post Office
 Nakashima Port
 Prefectural Route 83
 Yamato Minami Interchange - Yamato Kita Interchange (Ariake Engan Road)
 Japan National Route 208

Railway stations in Fukuoka Prefecture
Railway stations in Japan opened in 1938